Sex Machineguns (stylized as SEX MACHINEGUNS) is a Japanese heavy metal band formed in 1989. Their music is characterized by a heavy focus on bass as well as extremely fast guitar and bass solos. The band uses the image of "shock rockers" by wearing crazy, exotic outfits like visual kei bands, although this image has been toned down, especially since 2003 when the long-term bassist Noisy left the band. The lyrics feature very off-beat and non-serious themes (the superior quality of Satsuma fruits in Ehime prefecture, minor annoyance in family restaurants, etc.). In addition to their image and attitude, they also exhibit technical skill on their instruments.

Biography
Sex Machineguns started in 1989 in Kagoshima as an indie group, touring live houses and clubs. Their name is intentionally similar to that of the Sex Pistols and, according to the band, "implying that [we] machineguns are more radical than [the] pistols". They gained a large fan base quickly and sold out their shows. They went on tour and spread their popularity all over Japan. Once they got back home to release their first video and live CD in spring 1997, they had developed such a fan base that the first press of the video sold out instantly, to all parts of Japan from Okinawa to Hokkaidō.

In 1998, Sex Machineguns made their commercial debut with the release of their first single on Toshiba-EMI Records: "Hanabi-la Daikaiten". The single sold out instantly, and it was decided they would go on a debut tour (which sold out in every location). Magazines began to run articles, and the "Hanabi-la Daikaiten" single sold steadily, skyrocketing the band's popularity. In September they released their first album, which was another huge hit. They went on many tours, all selling out, and topped the singles charts. As 1998 came to a close, the Sex Machineguns had topped the charts and played 62 concerts (all sold out).

The band's front-man announced that the band would be taking a "activity pause" on March 20, 2006. All members at the time except for Anchang had left the band and formed a new band/side-project called Elleguns which released a 6-track instrumental. In 2004, Clutch J. Himawari and Noisy have formed a 3-man group called Dustar-3 with Yuki (formerly of Lucifer). Later in December 2006, Circuit V. Panther, Samurai W. Kenjilaw, and Speed Star Sypan Joe have started a new band known as Cycle. Anchang later reformed Sex Machineguns in 2007 with Ryotatsu Kuwae on guitar and Kenichi Imai on drums, and they released three digital download-only singles that year.

In 2008 Anchang formed the band Big Bites, with Natchin (Siam Shade) and Annie (The Yellow Monkey). Also in 2008, some footage of the band performing was featured in the film Global Metal during a discussion about heavy metal in Japan.

On 2012, drummer Ken'ichi withdrew, and the band went to an indefinite long time hiatus.

In 2013 Anchang and Shingo☆ formed a similar band called The Maintenance☆ (ザ☆メンテナンス), with Hirota on drums and second lead guitarist Master. They released their debut album Kōji-chū (工事中) on February 21, 2013.

Members

Current members
Anchang (Koji Ando) – lead vocals (1994–present), guitar (1989–present)
Sussy (Masahito Furuya) - Lead Guitar (1996–2001, 2008–present* as touring musician)
Shingo☆ (Shingo Tamaki) – bass (2008–present)
THOMAS – Drums (2022–present)

Former members
Asada – vocals (1989–1992)
Imai – vocals (1996)
Noisy (Hiroshi Ohta) – vocals (as H.Ohta, 1993); guitar (1994); bass, backing vocals (1996–2003)
Zaamasu – bass (1989–1995)
Atkin-Sukkon – bass (1995–1996)
Samurai W. Kenjilaw (Kenjirou Murai) – bass, backing vocals (2004–2007)
Mad Power Tsuchiya (Hiroshi Tsuchiya) – drums (1989–1997)
Clutch J. Himawari (Jun Kanki) – drums (2000–2003)
Speed Star Sypan Joe (Koji Ueno) – drums (1997–1999, 2004–2006)
Ken'ichi (Kenichi Imai) – drums (2007–2012)
Circuit V. Panther (Yoshikazu Yahiro) – guitar, backing vocals (2001–2006)
Iberiko Moja Malmsteen (Ryotatsu Kuwae) – guitar (2007–2008)
Leon - drums (2013–2019)

Support members (former)
Cyzer A. Hamburg – synth guitar (April 2001–August 2001)
Crazy Horse Kameen – synth guitar (April 2001–August 2003)
Ryosuke (Dragon Sue) - guitar (October 2008-December 2008, May 2010-September 2011)
Takeo Shimoda - drums (February 2014–July 2014)

Timeline (Recording Era; 1997-present)

Discography

Albums

Singles

Other

Solo works

Videography
The naming scheme for the Sex Machineguns videos is as follows:
Video Sex = A compilation of the latest music videos from the band
SM Show = A compilation of concert video bits (SM Show 2 has a 90min full concert followed by a 20min clip of another, followed by some other clips, and then a second full 90min concert, for example)

References

External links
Official Site 
Official Blog - Cho-Jyukinzoku 
Big Bites Official Site 

Japanese heavy metal musical groups
Japanese power metal musical groups
Japanese glam metal musical groups
Japanese speed metal musical groups
Musical groups established in 1989
Musical groups from Kagoshima Prefecture